Ravinia State Forest is a , heavily wooded state forest in Indiana.  Located next to Morgan County's Burkart Creek Park, the property was acquired by use of the Indiana Department of Transportation's Crossroads 2000 fund.

References

Indiana state forests
Protected areas of Morgan County, Indiana